Unnai Naan Santhithen is a 1984 Indian Tamil-language film written and directed by K. Rangaraj, and produced by Kovaithambi. The film stars Sivakumar, Sujatha, Suresh and Revathi. It was released on 23 October 1984 and became a success. The film was remade in Hindi as Sindoor (1987) and in Telugu as Sumangali (1989).

Plot 
College student Indhumathi is the playful only child of Janaki. Indhu falls in love with fellow college student Murali. Murali's father, Sabapathy, and Janaki agree to their marriage but under the condition that both must graduate first. Indhu is worried about her Tamil exams as that's her weak subject. Sabapathy arranges for Indhu's professor, Raghuraman, to tutor her. Raghuraman is shocked to see that Janaki is Indhu's mother and even more shocked when Indu mentions her deceased father as Captain Jagdeesh.

In the past, Janaki and Raghuraman were married. Janaki sang at stage shows with her friend Vijay and Raghuraman suspected the two of having an affair. Unable to stand her husband's suspicions, Janaki left him and found sanctuary with Captain Jagdeesh who was a widower with a young daughter, Indhu. When the captain died, Janaki raised Indhu and allowed her to believe that Janaki was her biological mother.

In the years of separation with Janaki, Raghuraman has realised the error of his ways and is sympathetic to her current situation. He agrees to keep their marriage a secret and the two grow closer again. Murali sees the two in an intimate situation and informs Indhu of this. Janaki is now forced to deal with her daughter's displeasure and the fall out that her relationship with Raghuraman has on her relationship with Indhu.

Cast 
Adapted from opening credits:
 Sivakumar as Raghuraman
 Sujatha as Janaki
 Suresh as Murali
 Revathi as Indhumathi
 Mohan as Vijay (guest appearance)
 Sarath Babu as Captain Jagdeesh (guest appearance)
 V. K. Ramasamy as Sabapathy
 Poornam Viswanathan as Doctor
 Goundamani as Pandiya
 Y. Vijaya as Ammani
 Baby Rekha as young Indhumathi

Production 
Unnai Naan Santhithen was produced by Kovaithambi under Motherland Pictures, and was the fourth directorial venture of K. Rangaraj, who also wrote the screenplay. Editing was handled by R. Bhaskaran and B. Krishnakumar, and cinematography by Dinesh Baboo, while Aaroor Dass wrote the dialogues. For one song sequence, Revathi had to sport a dress made from feather.

Soundtrack 
The soundtrack was composed by Ilaiyaraaja. The song "Unnai Kaanum Neram", written by M. G. Vallabhan, attained popularity. Although not the last song written to be written by Kannadasan before his death, "Devan Thantha Veenai" was the last to be released. It is set in Kalyani raga, and "Hey I Love You" is set in Natabhairavi. "Devan Thantha Veenai" is based on "Nanna Jeeva Neenu" from the 1981 Kannada film Geetha.

Release 
Unnai Naan Santhithen was released on 23 October 1984. The film became a success, running for 150 days in theatres, besides earning a good name for Rangaraj in the Tamil film industry.

References

Bibliography

External links 
 

1980s Tamil-language films
1984 films
1984 romantic drama films
Films directed by K. Rangaraj
Films scored by Ilaiyaraaja
Indian romantic drama films
Tamil films remade in other languages